Mahmud Muzahhib was a Persian painter who played a key-role in transferring the artstyle of the Timurids of Herat to the Uzbek court at Bukhara.

References

Sources 
 
 

16th-century Iranian painters
16th-century deaths
People from the Timurid Empire